Elbert Clark Matthews (born October 3, 1995) is an American professional basketball player. He played college basketball for the Rhode Island Rams where he was a Second-team All-Atlantic 10 in 2015.

High school career
He was born in Detroit, Michigan and attended Romulus High School. As a senior, Matthews averaged 17.5 points, 7.2 rebounds, and 2.5 assists per game and led Romulus to a state title. He was a 4 star recruit who committed to Rhode Island.

College career
As a freshman, Matthews averaged 14.3 points per game and was named A-10 rookie of the year. He increased his points production to 16.9 per game as a sophomore and led Rhode Island to the NIT. He was named to the Second Team All-Atlantic 10. In his junior season, he suffered a season-ending injury to his right knee in the first game. He credits the injury for teaching him how to live in the moment.

As a redshirt junior, he was named to the Third Team All-Atlantic 10. Matthews averaged 14.9 points and 4.3 rebounds per game and was Most Outstanding Player of the A-10 tournament after leading Rhode Island to a title. In November 2017, he fractured his wrist and missed several games. He repeated on the Third Team All-Atlantic 10 as a senior. He led the Rams to an NCAA Tournament appearance and averaged 13.1 points per game. Matthews scored 23 points in his season-ending loss to Duke in the NCAA Tournament.

Professional career
Matthews signed his first professional contract with Kouvot of the Korisliiga. On October 26, 2019, Matthews was selected 16th overall by the Erie BayHawks in the 2019 NBA G League Draft. He was the only BayHawks draftee to make the team. Matthews averaged 3.7 points, 1.5 rebounds and one assist per game in 15 games. He was waived on January 2, 2020. On January 6, 2020, Matthews signed with the Raptors 905. He was waived on January 16 after appearing in two games. 

On June 18, 2020, Matthews signed with Oliveirense of the Liga Portuguesa de Basquetebol (LPB).

In October 2021, Matthews signed with Grindavík of the Úrvalsdeild karla. On 25 March 2022, Matthews scored a game winning three pointer at the buzzer against Stjarnan.

On May 8, 2022, Matthews was announced by the Angolan club Petro de Luanda to join the team for the 2022 BAL Playoffs.

On October 21, 2022, Matthews signed with KR, replacing Michael Mallory. On January 2, 2023, it was announced he would leave the team following its game against Grindavík on 5 January.

References 

1995 births
Living people
American expatriate basketball people in Angola
American expatriate basketball people in Finland
American men's basketball players
Atlético Petróleos de Luanda basketball players
Basketball players from Detroit
Erie BayHawks (2019–2021) players
Grindavík men's basketball players
Kouvot players
KR men's basketball players
Raptors 905 players
Rhode Island Rams men's basketball players
Shooting guards
Úrvalsdeild karla (basketball) players